Matakana Nominees Pty. Ltd., trading as King Island Airlines, is a small regional airline based in Moorabbin, Australia. It operates a service between Moorabbin in Victoria and King Island.

Destinations 
 King Island Airport
 Moorabbin Airport

Fleet 

As of August 2011 the King Island Airlines fleet consists of:

1 Embraer EMB 110 Bandeirante
4 Piper PA-31-350 Chieftain

See also
List of airlines of Australia

References

External links
King Island Airlines

Airlines of Australia
Transport in Tasmania
King Island (Tasmania)
Companies based in Tasmania